Howard Maxwell Venning (5 April 1915 – 1 June 1995) was an Australian politician who represented the South Australian House of Assembly seat of Electoral district of Rocky River for the Liberal and Country League and Liberal Party from 1968 to 1979.

References

 

1915 births
1995 deaths
Members of the South Australian House of Assembly
Liberal Party of Australia members of the Parliament of South Australia
Liberal and Country League politicians
20th-century Australian politicians